Rodrigo Nascimento Ferreira (born November 26, 1992) is a Brazilian mixed martial artist who competes in the Heavyweight division of the Ultimate Fighting Championship.

Background
Born in Belo Horizonte, Nascimento met his mentor, Everton Rabelo de Andrade, at a LAN party while playing video games. Andrade taught kids and young adults martial arts in the city, and invited Nascimento to be part of the team. On Oct. 2010, the teenager entered his gym and started his MMA career.

Mixed martial arts career

Early career
Starting his professional career in 2012, two months after the death of his mentor, Nascimento got a perfect 8–0 record on the regional Brazilian scene, finishing his opponent in all eight bouts, 4 by submission and 2 by TKO.

Nascimento was invited to Dana White's Contender Series 22 and faced Michal Martinek on July 30, 2019. He won the bout via arm triangle in the first round, gaining a UFC contract in the process.

Ultimate Fighting Championship
Nascimento faced Don'Tale Mayes on May 16, 2020 at UFC on ESPN: Overeem vs. Harris. He won the bout via second round rear naked choke.

Nascimento faced Chris Daukaus on October 11, 2020 at UFC Fight Night: Moraes vs. Sandhagen. He lost the bout via first minute KO.

Nascimento was scheduled to face Alan Baudot on May 22, 2021 at UFC Fight Night: Font vs. Garbrandt. However, after Baudot was injured, the bout was moved to UFC on ESPN: Makhachev vs. Moisés held on July 17, 2021. Nascimento won the fight via technical knockout in round two. This win earned him the Performance of the Night award. However, Nascimento’s urine test from the fight tested positive for ritalinic acid, a metabolite of psychostimulant drugs methylphenidate and ethylphenidate. As a result, Nascimento received a six-month suspension, retroactive to the test. He was also fined a total of $1,945.36, for the violation and subsequent legal fees. The bout was also overturned to a no contest.

Nascimento was scheduled to face Tanner Boser on April 23, 2022, at UFC Fight Night 205. However, Nascimento withdrew from the event for unknown reasons, and he was replaced by Alexander Romanov.

Nascimento was rebooked against Tanner Boser for September 17, 2022 at UFC Fight Night: Sandhagen vs. Song. Nascimento won the fight via split decision.

Nascimento is scheduled to face Ilir Latifi on May 20, 2023, at UFC Fight Night 225.

Championships and accomplishments

Mixed martial arts
Ultimate Fighting Championship
 Performance of the Night (One Time)

Mixed martial arts record

|-
|Win
|align=center|9–1 (1)
|Tanner Boser
|Decision (split)
|UFC Fight Night: Sandhagen vs. Song 
|
|align=center|3
|align=center|5:00
|Las Vegas, Nevada, United States
|
|-
|NC
|align=center|8–1 (1)
|Alan Baudot
|NC (overturned)
|UFC on ESPN: Makhachev vs. Moisés
|
|align=center|2
|align=center|1:29
|Las Vegas, Nevada, United States
|
|-
| Loss
| align=center|8–1
| Chris Daukaus
|KO (punches)
|UFC Fight Night: Moraes vs. Sandhagen 
|
|align=center|1
|align=center|0:45
|Abu Dhabi, United Arab Emirates
| 
|-
| Win
| align=center| 8–0
| Don'Tale Mayes
|Submission (rear-naked choke)
|UFC on ESPN: Overeem vs. Harris
|
|align=center|2
|align=center|2:05
|Jacksonville, Florida, United States
| 
|-
| Win
| align=center| 7–0
| Michal Martinek
|Submission (arm-triangle choke)
| Dana White's Contender Series 22
| 
| align=center| 1
| align=center| 3:16
| Las Vegas, Nevada, United States
|
|-
| Win
| align=center|6–0
|Everton dos Anjos
|Submission (kimura)
|JF Fight Evolution 18
|
|align=center|1
|align=center|1:39
|Juiz de Fora, Brazil
|
|-
| Win
| align=center|5–0
|Fabio Moreira
|Submission (armbar)
|BH Sparta 10
|
|align=center|2
|align=center|3:00
|Belo Horizonte, Brazil
|
|-
| Win
| align=center| 4–0
| Fabricio Nascimento Silva
|Submission (triangle choke)
|BH Sparta 8
|
|align=center|1
|align=center|1:14
|Belo Horizonte, Brazil
|
|-
| Win
| align=center|3–0
| Ricardo Jordano
|TKO (punches)
| Full House Battle Home 6
|
| align=center|1
| align=center|0:39
|Belo Horizonte, Brazil
|
|-
| Win
| align=center| 2–0
| Rafael Caixeta
| Submission (rear-naked choke)
|Full House: Battle Home 5
|
| align=center|1
| align=center|2:43
|Belo Horizonte, Brazil
|
|-
| Win
| align=center|1–0
| Cicero Augusto
| TKO (punches)
|Full House Fight Night
|
|align=center|1
|align=center|0:42
|Belo Horizonte, Brazil
|

See also 
 List of current UFC fighters
 List of male mixed martial artists

References

External links 
  *
 

1992 births
Living people
Brazilian male mixed martial artists
Heavyweight mixed martial artists
Mixed martial artists utilizing Brazilian jiu-jitsu
Ultimate Fighting Championship male fighters
Brazilian practitioners of Brazilian jiu-jitsu
Sportspeople from Belo Horizonte